Casuarina equisetifolia, common names Coastal She-oak or  Horsetail She-oak (sometimes referred to as the Australian pine tree or whistling pine tree outside Australia), is a she-oak species of the genus Casuarina. The native range extends throughout Southeast Asia, Northern Australia and the Pacific Islands; including Thailand, Myanmar, Vietnam, Malaysia, Singapore, Brunei, Indonesia, East Timor, and the Philippines (where it is known as agoho pine), east to Papua New Guinea, French Polynesia, New Caledonia, and Vanuatu, and south to Australia (north of Northern Territory, north and east Queensland, and north-eastern New South Wales). Populations are also found in Madagascar, but it is doubtful if this is within the native range of the species. The species has been introduced to the Southern United States and West Africa. It is an invasive species in Florida, South Africa, India and Brazil.

Taxonomy 
Casuarina equisetifolia was officially described by Linnaeus in 1759 as Casuarina equisetifolia. A type was designated by New South Wales botanist Lawrie Johnson in 1989. 
The specific name equisetifolia is derived from the Latin equisetum, meaning "horse hair" (referring to the resemblance of the drooping branchlets to horse tail). 
Common names include coast sheoak (coast she oak, coastal she-oak), beach casuarina, beach oak, beach sheoak (beach she-oak), beach pine, whistling tree, horsetail she oak, horsetail beefwood, horsetail tree, Australian pine, ironwood, whistling pine, Filao tree, and agoho.

There are two subspecies:
Casuarina equisetifolia subsp. equisetifolia. Southeast Asia, northern Australia.
Casuarina equisetifolia subsp. incana (Benth.) L.A.S.Johnson. Eastern Australia (eastern Queensland, New South Wales), New Caledonia, southern Vanuatu.

Description

Tree and leaves 
The foliage consists of slender, much-branched green to grey-green twigs  diameter, bearing minute scale-leaves in whorls of 6–8.

Like some other species of the genus Casuarina, C. equisetifolia is an actinorhizal plant able to fix atmospheric nitrogen. In contrast to species of the plant family Fabaceae (e.g., beans, alfalfa, Acacia), Casuarina harbours a symbiosis with a Frankia actinomycete.

Flowers 
Unlike most other species of Casuarina (which are dioecious) it is monoecious, with male and female flowers produced on the same tree.

Fruit 

When these fruits ripen, they turn brown and open, dispersing the seeds by water. The seeds can only grow in hot sand near the seashore. Those seeds sprout and form thickets.

Distribution and habitat 
Casuarina is found from Myanmar and Vietnam throughout Malesia east to French Polynesia, New Caledonia, and Vanuatu, and south into Australia (the northern parts of Northern Territory, north and east Queensland, and northeastern New South Wales, where it extends as far south as Laurieton.

Uses 
Casuarina is widely used as a bonsai subject, particularly in South-east Asia and parts of the Caribbean. Indonesian specimens and those cultivated in Taiwan are regarded among the best in the bonsai world. The wood of this tree is used for shingles, fencing, and is said to make excellent hot-burning firewood. Among the islands of Hawaii, Casuarina are also grown for erosion prevention, and in general as wind breaking elements.

The Casuarina leaves are usually used for ornamental purposes in the urban region.

Other than ornamental purposes, the Casuarina was also explored in for its potential in remediation of textile dye wastewater. Casuarina leaves were found to be useful as absorbent material for the removal of textile dyes such as reactive orange 16 Rhodamine B, methylene blue, malachite green and methyl violet 2b. Similarly the Casuarina dried cone was also reported to be able to remove Rhodamine B, and methyl violet 2b. The Casuarina bark was reported to able to remove methylene blue. Even the Casuarina seed was also found to be useful in dye removal of neutral red and malachite green. The carbon derived from the cones of Casuarina was found to be good absorbent for the landfill leachate, while another laboratory also reported good absorbent for copper ions from aqueous solution. Casuarina equisetifolia Lin. (Casuarinaceae) has been used traditionally for treating inflammation, cancer and other diseases, but its efficacy has not been scientifically examined in treating arthritis; the bark extract showed anti-arthritic activity. Methanolic extract of Casuarina equisetifolia fruit contain significant percentage of secondary metabolite like poly phenol, it showed antioxidant and anti-arthritic activity. Methanolic extract of Casuarina equisetifolia Lin. Leaf against Ehrlich Ascites Carcinoma Induced Cancer in Mice; possess protective action on the hemopoietic system.

Relationship with humans

Names of places 
There are many places in South Asia and Southeast Asia named after this plant. In Sri Lanka, a famous beach on the Jaffna Peninsula, Casuarina Beach, is named because of the many Casuarina trees that line the coast. Casuarina is known as ru, rhu or aru in Malay. Many coastal fisherman villages in Terengganu have names such as Ru Renggeh, Ru Dua, Rusila formerly Ru Se Le (Ru Satu Pokok Sahaja "Just One Casuarina Tree"), and Ru Rendang.

There are many places named because they have a cape (tanjung) where casuarina trees grow there. In Singapore, there is a road named Tanjong Rhu Road because it once had many of these trees growing along the coast from Kallang to Rochor. In the island of Langkawi, Kedah, Malaysia, there is a sand spit in the mouth of the Ayer Hangat river in the Kilim Karst Geoforest Park about 20 km from the town of Kuah also named Tanjung Rhu where these trees line here. The town of Tanjung Aru in Sabah is also named because a lot of this tree (aru) is found in its beach.

Culture 
The legendary miraculous spear Kaumaile came with the hero Tefolaha on the South Pacific island Nanumea. He fought with it on the islands of Samoa and Tonga. As Tefolaha died, "Kaumaile" went to his heirs, then to their heirs, and on and on - 23 generations. It is about 1.80 meters long and about 880 years old and the tree was cut on Samoa.

Gallery

See also
Pinus kesiya, the Khasi or Benguet pine

References

External links
 NT Flora: Casuarina equisetifolia. Northern Territory Government.

equisetifolia
Drought-tolerant trees
Fagales of Australia
Flora of Asia
Flora of Queensland
Flora of New Caledonia
Flora of the Northern Mariana Islands
Flora of New South Wales
Flora of the Northern Territory
Plants used in bonsai
Taxa named by Carl Linnaeus
Trees of Australia
Flora without expected TNC conservation status